{{Infobox settlement
| name                   =  
| image_skyline          = Matnog01.jpg 
| image_caption          = Skyline of Matnog
| image_flag             = Flag of Matnog, Sorsogon.png
| flag_size              = 120x80px
| image_seal             = Matnog Sorsogon.png
| seal_size              = 100x80px
| image_map              = 
| map_caption            = 
| image_map1             = 
| pushpin_map            = Philippines
| pushpin_label_position = left
| pushpin_map_caption    = Location within the 
| coordinates            = 
| settlement_type        = 
| subdivision_type       = Country
| subdivision_name       = Philippines
| subdivision_type1      = Region
| subdivision_name1      = 
| subdivision_type2      = Province
| subdivision_name2      = 
| official_name          = 
| etymology              =  
| named_for              =  
| native_name            =
| other_name             =
| nickname               = Gateway of Luzon
| motto                  =
| anthem                 =
| subdivision_type3      = District
| subdivision_name3      = 
| established_title      = Founded
| established_date       = May 17, 1800
| parts_type             = Barangays
| parts_style            = para
| p1                     =   (see Barangays)
| leader_title           =  
| leader_name            = Claudith M. So
| leader_title1          = Vice Mayor
| leader_name1           = Carlos G. Estrelon Jr.
| leader_title2          = Representative 
| leader_name2           = Vacant
| leader_title3          = Municipal Council
| leader_name3           =  
| leader_title4          = Electorate 
| leader_name4           =  voters
| government_type        = 
| government_footnotes   = 
| elevation_m            = 
| elevation_max_m        = 354
| elevation_min_m        = 0
| elevation_max_rank     =
| elevation_min_rank     =
| elevation_footnotes    = 
| elevation_max_footnotes= 
| elevation_min_footnotes= 
| area_rank              =
| area_footnotes         = 
| area_total_km2         = 
| population_footnotes   = 
| population_total       = 
| population_as_of       = 
| population_density_km2 = auto
| population_blank1_title= Households
| population_blank1      =  
| population_blank2_title= 
| population_blank2      = 
| population_demonym     =
| population_rank        =
| population_note        =
| timezone               = PST
| utc_offset             = +8
| postal_code_type       = ZIP code
| postal_code            = 
| postal2_code_type      = 
| postal2_code           = 
| area_code_type         = 
| area_code              = 
| website                = 
| demographics_type1     = Economy
| demographics1_title1   = 
| demographics1_info1    = 
| demographics1_title2   = Poverty incidence
| demographics1_info2    = %
| demographics1_title3   = Revenue
| demographics1_info3    =   
| demographics1_title4   = Revenue rank
| demographics1_info4    = 
| demographics1_title5   = Assets
| demographics1_info5    =   
| demographics1_title6   = Assets rank
| demographics1_info6    = 
| demographics1_title7   = IRA
| demographics1_info7    =  
| demographics1_title8   = IRA rank
| demographics1_info8    = 
| demographics1_title9   = Expenditure
| demographics1_info9    =   
| demographics1_title10  = Liabilities
| demographics1_info10   =  
| demographics_type2     = Service provider 
| demographics2_title1   = Electricity
| demographics2_info1    = 
| demographics2_title2   = Water
| demographics2_info2    =  
| demographics2_title3   = Telecommunications
| demographics2_info3    = 
| demographics2_title4   = Cable TV
| demographics2_info4    =
| demographics2_title5   = 
| demographics2_info5    =
| demographics2_title6   = 
| demographics2_info6    =
| demographics2_title7   = 
| demographics2_info7    =
| demographics2_title8   = 
| demographics2_info8    =
| demographics2_title9   = 
| demographics2_info9    =
| demographics2_title10  = 
| demographics2_info10   =
| blank_name_sec1        = 
| blank_info_sec1        = 
| blank1_name_sec1       = Native languages
| blank1_info_sec1       = 
| blank2_name_sec1       = Crime index
| blank2_info_sec1       = 
| blank3_name_sec1       = 
| blank3_info_sec1       = 
| blank4_name_sec1       = 
| blank4_info_sec1       = 
| blank5_name_sec1       = 
| blank5_info_sec1       = 
| blank6_name_sec1       = 
| blank6_info_sec1       = 
| blank7_name_sec1       = 
| blank7_info_sec1       = 
| blank1_name_sec2       = Major religions
| blank1_info_sec2       = 
| blank2_name_sec2       = Feast date
| blank2_info_sec2       = 
| blank3_name_sec2       = Catholic diocese
| blank3_info_sec2       =
| blank4_name_sec2       = Patron saint 
| blank4_info_sec2       = 
| blank5_name_sec2       = 
| blank5_info_sec2       = 
| blank6_name_sec2       = 
| blank6_info_sec2       = 
| blank7_name_sec2       = 
| blank7_info_sec2       =
| short_description      =
| footnotes              =
}}

Matnog, officially the Municipality of Matnog (Waray Sorsogon: Bungto san Matnog;), is a 3rd class municipality in the province of Sorsogon, Philippines. According to the 2020 census, it has a population of 41,989 people. 

Matnog’s port is one of the busiest in the region, playing host to millions of people crossing the San Bernardino Strait to Northern Samar annually. It is the jump off point to the southern Philippines and vice versa.

 History 
Local elders say that the name Matnog comes from the word "matonog''" (very audible) - that describes to the loud sound of the waves. The native people of Matnog are the Agta, Tabangon, and Cimaron Tribe.

Geography

Barangays
Matnog is politically subdivided into 40 barangays.

Climate

Demographics

Economy

Transportation
Transportation includes buses going to and from Metro Manila and Bulan and ferries going to and from Allen, Northern Samar.

In order to spur development in the municipality, The Toll Regulatory Board declared Toll Road 5 the extension of South Luzon Expressway. A 420-kilometer, four lane expressway starting from the terminal point of the now under construction SLEX Toll Road 4 at Barangay Mayao, Lucena City in Quezon to Matnog, Sorsogon, near the Matnog Ferry Terminal. On August 25, 2020, San Miguel Corporation announced that they will invest the project which will reduce travel time from Lucena to Matnog from 9 hours to 5.5 hours.

Gallery

References

External links

 Matnog Profile at PhilAtlas.com
 [ Philippine Standard Geographic Code]
 Philippine Census Information
 Local Governance Performance Management System
 Matnog, Sorsogon LGU Profile

Municipalities of Sorsogon
Port cities and towns in the Philippines